Hurricane Naomi was a short-lived Category 1 hurricane that made landfall in Mexico's Pacific coast during the 1968 Pacific hurricane season. After rapidly intensifying before its landfall in Sinaloa, Naomi caused rainfall throughout northern Mexico and the U.S. state of Texas in association with a frontal system, with the highest measurement occurring in Corpus Christi. Four people perished in Mexico due to Naomi's effects with ten more missing, all in Sinaloa. The only reported injury in Texas due to the remnants was a factory worker who was injured when the roof of the plant they were working in collapsed due to rainfall.

Naomi was the seventeenth tropical depression, fourteenth tropical storm and the fourth hurricane of the 1968 Pacific hurricane season. Its precipitation on the Mexican Altiplano briefly threatened the unfinished Lázaro Cárdenas dam on the Nazas River. If the dam failed,  the twin cities of Gómez Palacio, Durango, and Torreón, Coahuila, would have been inundated. On the other hand, releasing water from the dam would have saved Torreón by submerging Gómez Palacio with the dam's runoff. From help with satellite imagery, the authorities decided to keep the dam closed—risking its possible failure—saving both towns.

Meteorological history

The depression continued to develop at a rapid pace, with large feeder bands which helped to absorb moisture to strengthen the cyclone extending from the center, which was becoming better defined. Towards the end of the day, the Allison Lykes reported  winds from the cyclone and, early on September 11, sufficient evidence that the depression had reached tropical storm status resulted in the cyclone being upgraded and named "Naomi".

For the next twelve hours, Naomi continued to rapidly intensify, with feeder bands flowing into a tightening spiral structure in the center of the storm. After being upgraded, the hurricane moved to the north at a pace of  before making a slow northeastward turn. The hurricane then began to accelerate, landfalling on Sinaloa near Punta Piaxtla at 3:00 GMT on September 13. Shortly after landfall, the Sierra Madre Occidental took a toll on the hurricane, causing it to dissipate later that day while midway between Chihuahua, Chih., and Piedras Negras, Coah., with the remnants moving over Texas. In total, the hurricane travelled  while active.

Impact

Mexico

A dispatch from the Associated Press to Mexico City reported that 20,000 citizens from villages in Durango, Sinaloa, Nayarit, and Jalisco evacuated due to the threat of flooding and high winds from Naomi. The damage from Naomi in Mexico was moderate, although no monetary figures have ever been released. The Associated Press dispatch also reported that Naomi was responsible for knocking out communications over a large area in Mazatlán as well as downing power lines and damaging houses. At least 2000 people were reported homeless in Durango due to the hurricane. The hurricane also caused damage to Highway 15 between Mazatlán and Tepic. Although the highway reopened soon afterward, some areas that were struck by the hurricane were still rough. Naomi's most notable impact in Mexico involved the Lázaro Cárdenas Dam on the Nazas River, which was not complete by the time the hurricane hit. The dam, upriver from Gómez Palacio and Torreón, was feared to break down from the water being built up behind it, influenced by the hurricane. The two options were to either open the dam, saving Torreón by inundating Gómez Palacio, or risk inundating both towns by keeping the dam closed. The decision was made harder by the fact that, if the dam was released and no rain fell to refill the basin behind the dam, the farms would have insufficient water for agricultural growth. Photography from the Environmental Science Services Administration's Automatic Picture Transmission based on the ESSA-6 weather satellite showed that the clouds from Naomi responsible for the rain had almost moved over the area near the dam. Based on the images, the authorities decided to gamble on the dam to successfully hold up, and it managed to hold back the waters without breaking. The hurricane caused four drowning deaths and $16 million in damage in Sinaloa.

Texas

In Texas, the remnants of Naomi coupled with a frontal system resulted in prolonged rains over the state. The hardest hit city was Corpus Christi, which reported over 8 inches (200 mm) of rain in relation to the disturbance as well as funnel clouds to the south and west of the city, resulting in many roads being stopped to traffic. Accumulated rainfall caused the roof of a tortilla plant to collapse, slightly injuring a worker. Although the range of heavy rains was large, only minor rains were reported in Andrews, Crane, Monahans, Kermit, Wink, Stanton, and Pecos. Despite the totals, the rain proved beneficial as well, helping saturate areas of grassland in need of water.

Naming
This was the second time an East Pacific storm was named Naomi and the only time that a storm named Naomi in the basin reached hurricane strength. Because the effects from the hurricane were minor, the name was not retired after this hurricane and was re-used in the 1976 season. However, a name change in 1978 dropped the name Naomi, and the name has not been used since.

See also

Other tropical cyclones named Naomi
List of Pacific hurricanes
Malpasset—A French dam that broke in 1959 due to circumstances similar to those that affected the Lázaro Cárdenas Dam, killing 421.

References

Pacific hurricanes in Mexico
Hurricanes in Texas
1968 Pacific hurricane season
Category 1 Pacific hurricanes
1968 natural disasters in the United States
1968 in Mexico